Narongchai Vachiraban (born February 16, 1981), simply known as Tum, is a Thai retired professional footballer who plays as an attacking midfielder. He previously played for six other club sides in Thailand and Vietnam.

International career
Narongchai has currently played 23 times for the full Thailand National team and scored 3 goals.

International career statistics

International goals

Honours

Club
Bangkok Christian College
 Thai Division 1 League: 2001–02

PEA
 Thai Premier League: 2008

Muangthong United
 Thai Premier League: 2010

International
Thailand U-23
 Sea Games Gold Medal: 2001

References

External links
Goal.com

1981 births
Living people
Narongchai Vachiraban
Narongchai Vachiraban
Association football midfielders
Narongchai Vachiraban
Binh Dinh FC players
Narongchai Vachiraban
Narongchai Vachiraban
Narongchai Vachiraban
Narongchai Vachiraban
Narongchai Vachiraban
Narongchai Vachiraban
Narongchai Vachiraban
V.League 2 players
Thai expatriate footballers
Thai expatriate sportspeople in Vietnam
Expatriate footballers in Vietnam
Narongchai Vachiraban
Footballers at the 2002 Asian Games
2004 AFC Asian Cup players
Narongchai Vachiraban
Southeast Asian Games medalists in football
Competitors at the 2001 Southeast Asian Games
Narongchai Vachiraban